Paradise Unified School District is a public school district in Butte County, California, United States.

External links
 

School districts in Butte County, California